Pertti Mäkipää (4 August 1941 – 19 August 2019) was a Finnish footballer. He played in 46 matches for the Finland national football team from 1962 to 1970. He played for a number of clubs in his native Finland, mostly in Tampere

References

External links
 

1941 births
2019 deaths
Finnish footballers
Finland international footballers
Place of birth missing
Association footballers not categorized by position
Tampereen Pallo-Veikot players
Reipas Lahti players
FC Kuusysi players
Ilves players